Viejo Marihuano is the seventh studio album from Mexican hip hop group Cartel de Santa. It was released on November 18, 2016, by Sony Music and Babilonia Music. The album has featured guests such as Millonario, Santa Estilo and Bicho Ramirez.

Track listing 
 Volvió El Sensei
 Leve
 Bailar y Volar (ft. Millonario)
 Desde Cuando
 Clika Nostra (ft. Santa Estilo)
 Mucha Marihuana
 Culón Culito 
 El Loco Mas Loco
 Si Estuviera En Dubai
 Somos Chidos (ft. Bicho Ramirez)
 Soy Quien Soy

References

2016 albums
Cartel de Santa albums